Dimitri Ramothe is a Guadeloupean footballer who plays for plays as striker for the Guadeloupe national football team.

International career 
Ramothe made his debut for Guadeloupe on 7 September 2019, in a 2019–20 CONCACAF Nations League C match against Sint Maarten. He scored the first goal of the game in the sixth minute, and Guadeloupe went on to win 5-1. Ramothe went on to play in all of Guadeloupe's Nations League matches that campaign, and finished with three goals as Guadeloupe went undefeated, being promoted to League B for the next edition and advancing to the first round of the 2021 CONCACAF Gold Cup Qualifiers.

Career Statistics

International

International goals

References

1990 births
Living people
Guadeloupean footballers
Association football forwards
Guadeloupe international footballers
2021 CONCACAF Gold Cup players